John Joseph "Pa" Harkins (April 12, 1859 – November 20, 1940) was a 19th-century Major League Baseball player who pitched for three teams in his five season career that lasted from  to .

Playing career

After attending Rutgers University as a chemistry student, he signed a contract with a Semi-professional team based in Trenton, New Jersey in 1881. He played with Trenton until 1884 when he was sold to the Cleveland Blues of the National League. John finished his first major league season with 12 wins against 32 losses, 42 complete games, and a 3.68 earned run average.

When the 1884 season finished, the Blues folded, and many of their player were bought by the Brooklyn Grays, including John, Doc Bushong, George Pinkney, and Germany Smith. During his three seasons with Brooklyn he pitched alongside of ace Henry Porter, and Adonis Terry, winning 39 games. He was sold to the Baltimore Orioles after the  season and pitched in only game.

Post-career

During John's playing days, he acted in an advisory role for the coaching staff of the baseball teams at Yale University, Lehigh University and Princeton University. Later, when he took over as the head coach of Yale's baseball team, one of his players was long-time future college football head coach for the University of Chicago and the University of the Pacific, Amos Alonzo Stagg. Harkins convinced Stagg to switch from outfielder to pitcher, and the two became friends, a friendship that lasted over 50 years. Later owned and operated a café for many years, and was an alderman in New Brunswick and then a Sergeant-at-Arms for the local court.

John died of a heart attack at the age of 81 in his hometown of New Brunswick, and is interred at St. Peter's Cemetery.

References

External links

 

1859 births
1940 deaths
Major League Baseball pitchers
Sportspeople from New Brunswick, New Jersey
Baseball players from New Jersey
19th-century baseball players
Cleveland Blues (NL) players
Brooklyn Grays players
Baltimore Orioles (NL) players
Trenton (minor league baseball) players